Jean Janssens may refer to:

Jean Janssens (footballer) (born 1944), Belgian football player
Jean-Baptiste Janssens (1889–1964), Belgian Jesuit priest
Jean Janssens (cyclist), Belgian Olympic cyclist